Ahmad Kordary served as Prime Minister of the Azerbaijan People's Government from 1945 to 1946. The Chairman was Ja'far Pishevari.

References

Azerbaijani politicians